Ron Meyers may refer to:

 Ron_Meyers (potter) (born 1934), United States ceramic artist
 Ron Meyers (politician) (born 1950), United States politician from Washington state